Mark E. Anderson is a major general in the Army National Guard, currently serving as the Deputy Commanding General, United States Army Training and Doctrine Command.

Biography
Anderson graduated from the University of Wisconsin-Stevens Point in 1986. He currently lives in Wisconsin Rapids, Wisconsin.

Career
Anderson enlisted in the United States Army Reserve in 1983. Later he would transfer to the Wisconsin Army National Guard and be commissioned a second lieutenant. He later attended Army Command and General Staff College and United States Army War College. Aside from his service in Wisconsin, his services have also included a tour of duty in the Iraq War.

Assignments

Awards and assignments

References

Living people
People from Wisconsin Rapids, Wisconsin
Military personnel from Wisconsin
University of Wisconsin–Stevens Point alumni
United States Army generals
Recipients of the Order of Saint Maurice
United States Army personnel of the Iraq War
United States Army War College alumni
Year of birth missing (living people)